James Duncan Gordon (1 January 1896 – 30 September 1918) was an Australian rules footballer who played with Essendon in the Victorian Football League (VFL).

Family
The son of James Duncan, and Blanche Eleanor Duncan, née De Wart, née Edwards, James Duncan Gordon was born in Williamstown, Victoria on 1 January 1896.

Football
Recruited from Elsternwick, Gordon was a rover and half-forward who made his debut for Essendon, at the age of 18 years, against University on 9 August 1913; and, in that match, Gordon kicked the winning goal after the final bell.

Military service
He served as a bombardier in the army during World War I and was killed in action, in France, on 30 September 1918.

His step-brother, Ewen James Gordon (1891–1916), who also served in the First AIF, was also killed in action (on 18 August 1916).

See also
 List of Victorian Football League players who died in active service

Footnotes

References
 A Young Athlete, Table Talk, (Thursday, 11 January 1912), p.6.
 First World War Nominal Roll: Bombadier James Duncan Gordon (4016), Australian War Memorial.
 First World War Embarkation Roll: Bombadier James Duncan Gordon (4016), Australian War Memorial.
 Roll of Honour: Bombadier James Duncan Gordon (4016), Australian War Memorial.
 Maplestone, M., Flying Higher: History of the Essendon Football Club 1872–1996, Essendon Football Club, (Melbourne), 1996.

External links

Past-Player Profiles: James Gordon, essendonfc.com.

1896 births
Australian rules footballers from Melbourne
Essendon Football Club players
1918 deaths
Australian military personnel killed in World War I
People from Williamstown, Victoria
Military personnel from Melbourne